The Republic of Saugeais is a self-proclaimed micronation located in eastern France, in the département of Doubs. The republic comprises the 11 municipalities of Les Alliés, Arçon, Bugny, La Chaux-de-Gilley, Gilley, Hauterive-la-Fresse, La Longeville, Montflovin, Maisons-du-Bois-Lièvremont, Ville-du-Pont, and its capital Montbenoît.
Micronations

History
In 1947, the prefect of the département of Doubs came to Montbenoît to attend an official event. The prefect had lunch in the Hôtel de l'Abbaye in Montbenoît, which was owned by Georges Pourchet. As a joke, Pourchet asked the prefect "Do you have a permit allowing you to enter the Republic of Saugeais?" The prefect asked for details on the mysterious republic, which Pourchet made up on the spot. The prefect responded by appointing Pourchet president of the Free Republic of Saugeais.

Georges Pourchet died in 1968 and his wife Gabrielle initially succeeded as president. She retired in 1970 but remained active in Montbenoît, helping the parish priest to preserve the abbey. To raise funds, a festival was organised in 1972, during which Gabrielle Pourchet was elected President for life by acclamation.

President Gabrielle Pourchet appointed a prime minister, a general secretary, twelve ambassadors and more than 300 honorary citizens. A song written in the Langue Saugette, a Franco-Provençal dialect, by Joseph Botillon in 1910 was adopted as the republic's national anthem. A banknote was released in 1997, and the French Postal Service issued a postal stamp commemorating the republic in 1987.

Gabrielle Pourchet died on 31 August 2005, at the age of 99, and her daughter Georgette Bertin-Pourchet succeeded as president.

List of presidents

Georges Pourchet (1947–68)
Gabrielle Pourchet (1968 – 31 August 2005)
Georgette Bertin-Pourchet (31 August 2005 – 18 March 2022)
Simon Marguet (18 March 2022 – present)

References

External links
 , featuring information on the flag of the republic.

Geography of France
Micronations in France
Geography of Doubs
States and territories established in 1947